James Hay (1876–1940) was a footballer who played in the Football League for Barnsley and Chesterfield Town and in the Southern League for Stoke.

Career
Hay was born in Lanark and played for Renfrew Victoria before joining English Second Division side Barnsley in 1901. Hay spent seven seasons with the "Tykes" making 159 appearances scoring once which came in an FA Cup match against Swindon Town. He joined Chesterfield in 1908 and spent the 1908–09 season at Saltergate but left at the end of the season after they failed to gain re-election. He signed for Stoke in 1909 who at the time were playing in the Southern League and spent three seasons at the Victoria Ground making 70 appearances scoring three goals.

Career statistics
Source:

References

Scottish footballers
Barnsley F.C. players
Chesterfield F.C. players
Stoke City F.C. players
English Football League players
1876 births
1940 deaths
Association football fullbacks
Renfrew Victoria F.C. players
Sportspeople from Lanark
Scottish Junior Football Association players
Footballers from South Lanarkshire